

Rulers of the Kingdom of Allada

Territory located in present-day Benin.

Also known as Ardrah (Ardra), Ardrah Empire, Adja-Tado. Known to the French as Allada or Ardres.

(Dates in italics indicate de facto continuation of office)

Ajahutonon (Alada hosu) = King

Sources
 http://www.rulers.org/benitrad.html
 African States and Rulers, John Stewart, McFarland

See also
Benin
Fon people
King of Dahomey
List of rulers of the Fon state of Savi Hweda
Lists of office-holders

Fon people
Lists of African rulers
 
Alada